The  Connacht Junior Club Football Championship is a Gaelic football competition between the winners of the junior football championships in the province of Connacht, organised by Connacht. The winners of this competition will qualify for the All-Ireland Junior Club Football Championship.

Kilmaine of Mayo are the current champions, having defeated St Michael's of Sligo in the 2019 decider.

List of finals by year

See also
 Munster Junior Club Football Championship
 Leinster Junior Club Football Championship
 Ulster Junior Club Football Championship

References

3